Altizer may refer to:

Places 
Altizer, West Virginia, US

Surname 
Dave Altizer (1876–1964), American Major League Baseball player
 Rick Altizer, director, musician, and songwriter
Sonia Altizer (born 1970), American ecologist
Thomas J. J. Altizer (1927–2018), American theologian who postulated in the early 1960s the "death of God"

Middle name 
Ruby Altizer Roberts (1907–2004), American poet